McIntosh County Academy (MCA) is the only public high school in McIntosh County, Georgia, United States. It was formerly known as Darien High School.

History

In 1794, the city of Darien was given a charter to build a school. In 1820, a branch of the institution was created and classes were held at local churches. The actual school building was built in 1840 on the corner of Adam Street and Rittenhouse Street.

On March 3, 1892, an intentional fire destroyed McIntosh County Academy. The city rebuilt a brick building on top of the remains of the old school in the same year. This was the site of the school for many years, until Darien constructed the new high school off U.S Highway 17.

MCA was built using the one cent ESPLOST (Education Special Local Option Sales Tax).

Extra-curricular activities

 4-H
 Beta Club
 Drama Club
 FBLA (Future Business Leaders of America)
 FCA (Fellowship of Christian Athletes)
 FCCLA (Family, Career, Community Leaders of America)
 FFA (Future Farmers of America)
 Guitar Club
 HOSA (Health Occupations Students of America)
 Independent Authors
 Interact Club
 JOOIC (Junior Optimist Octagon International)
 National Honor Society
 Science Club
 Skills USA-Vica
 Student Council
 YAC (Youth Advisory Council)
 Yearbook
 Gaming club

Academics
In 2005, MCA began offering Advanced Placement classes in Calculus, English, US History, Environmental Science, and Art History. These classes are available to juniors and seniors.

MCA did not make AYP until 2007.

MCA was first place in the 2007 GHSA Region 2 GHSGT in English with a 93.7%. The graduation rate rose to third place among the GHSA boards, with 70.6% graduating.

Notable alumni
 Allen Bailey - NFL player, Atlanta Falcons Class of 2007

References

External links

 Official website
 McIntosh County School system

Public high schools in Georgia (U.S. state)
Schools in McIntosh County, Georgia
1875 establishments in Georgia (U.S. state)